Petra Vámos (born 14 September 2000) is a Hungarian handballer for Debreceni VSC and the Hungarian national team.

She made her international debut on 22 November 2019 against Russia. Since then she represented Hungary at a European Championship (2022), and two World Championship (2019, 2021) tournaments. She also participated in the Tokyo Summer Olympics in 2020, where the team finished 7th.

Achievements 
National team
Junior European Championship:
: 2019
European Youth Olympic Festival:
: 2017
IHF Youth World Championship:
: 2018
Youth European Championship:
: 2017

Individual awards
 Hungarian Junior Handballer of the Year: 2019

Personal life
She studies at the University of Debrecen. Her younger sister, Míra is also a professional handball player, and the two are teammates in Debrecen.

References

External links

2000 births
Living people
Hungarian female handball players
People from Ózd
Handball players at the 2020 Summer Olympics
Sportspeople from Borsod-Abaúj-Zemplén County